La paloma de la paz (2016) (Spanish for "The Peace Dove") is a sculpture by Fernando Botero created in response to the Colombian peace process. It was donated by the artist to the Government of Colombia to commemorate the signing and ratification of the final peace agreement with the FARC-EP guerrilla group.

History

Before the start of the Iván Duque  presidency, the sculpture was transferred to the National Museum of Colombia in a ceremony that was led by first lady María Clemencia Rodríguez Múnera. According to Martin Santos, son of President Juan Manuel Santos, Duque had requested the sculpture removed from the Casa de Nariño during the transition process.

During the 2022 Colombian presidential election, both second round presidential nominees, Gustavo Petro and Rodolfo Hernández vowed to return the sculpture to the Casa de Nariño.

For Gustavo Petro's presidential inauguration, his organizing team had requested that the sculpture be present during the ceremony however Ivan Duque, citing safety concerns, did not grant permission for the sculpture to be moved to the venue despite the organizing team having taken the

On 1 September 2022, the sculpture was transferred back to the Casa de Nariño from the National Museum.

References

Anti-war sculptures
Birds in art
Peace symbols
Political art
Sculptures of birds